Eplingiella is a genus of flowering plants belonging to the family Lamiaceae.

Its native range is eastern Brazil.

The genus name of Eplingiella is in honour of Carl Epling (1894–1968), an American botanist and taxonomist, and it was first published and described in Phytotaxa Vol.58 on page 21 in 2012.

Known species:
Eplingiella brightoniae 
Eplingiella cuniloides 
Eplingiella fruticosa

References

Lamiaceae
Lamiaceae genera
Plants described in 2012
Flora of Brazil